The 2016 Pacific-Asia Curling Championships were held from November 5 to 12 at the Gyeongbuk Uiseong Curling Training Center in Uiseong-eup, Uiseong County, South Korea. The top two teams from the men's tournament will qualify for the 2017 Ford World Men's Curling Championship and the top finisher will join China at the  2017 World Women's Curling Championship.

Men

Teams

Round-robin standings
Final standings

Round-robin results
All draw times are listed in Asia/Uiseong Time (UTC+09).

Draw 1
Saturday, November 5, 17:30

Draw 2
Sunday, November 6, 9:00

Draw 3
Sunday, November 6, 19:00

Draw 4
Monday, November 7, 14:00

Kazakhstan chose to forfeit their game after a disagreement over an umpiring decision.

Draw 5
Tuesday, November 8, 9:00

Draw 6
Tuesday, November 8, 19:00

Draw 7
Wednesday, November 9, 14:00

Draw 8
Thursday, November 10, 9:00

Draw 9
Thursday, November 10, 19:00

Playoffs

Semifinals
Friday, November 11, 19:00

Bronze-medal game
Saturday, November 12, 14:00

Gold-medal game
Saturday, November 12, 14:00

Women

Teams

Round-robin standings
Final standings

Round-robin results
All draw times are listed in Asia/Uiseong Time (UTC+09).

Draw 1
Sunday, November 6, 14:00

The team from  ran out of time in the Extra End, and therefore forfeited the game.

Draw 2
Monday, November 7, 9:00

Draw 3
Monday, November 7, 19:00

Draw 4
Tuesday, November 8, 14:00

Draw 5
Wednesday, November 9, 9:00

Draw 6
Wednesday, November 9, 19:00

Draw 7
Thursday, November 10, 14:00

Playoffs

Semifinals
Friday, November 11, 14:00

Bronze-medal game
Saturday, November 12, 9:00

Gold-medal game
Saturday, November 12, 9:00

References

External links

Pacific-Asia Curling Championships
Pacific-Asia Curling Championships
International curling competitions hosted by South Korea
Pacific-Asia Curling Championships
Pacific-Asia Curling Championships
Uiseong County